Fil de Dragiva is a mountain of the Lepontine Alps, located between Rossa and Soazza, in the Swiss canton of Graubünden.

References

External links
 Fil de Dragiva on Hikr

Mountains of the Alps
Mountains of Switzerland
Mountains of Graubünden
Lepontine Alps
Two-thousanders of Switzerland